James Gillan Mallon (28 August 1938 – 9 May 2012) was a Scottish footballer who played as a forward in the Football League.

References

External links

1938 births
2012 deaths
Scottish footballers
Footballers from Glasgow
Association football forwards
Partick Thistle F.C. players
Oldham Athletic A.F.C. players
Stranraer F.C. players
Greenock Morton F.C. players
Barrow A.F.C. players
Altrincham F.C. players
English Football League players
Scottish Football League players
Shawfield F.C. players
Scottish Junior Football Association players